Cho Myung-jun (born July 29, 1970) is a South Korean field hockey coach. At the 2012 Summer Olympics he coached the South Korea national field hockey team.

References

External links

Living people
1970 births
South Korean field hockey coaches
South Korean male field hockey players
Olympic field hockey players of South Korea
Field hockey players at the 1996 Summer Olympics
Field hockey players at the 1994 Asian Games
Field hockey players at the 1998 Asian Games
1998 Men's Hockey World Cup players
Asian Games gold medalists for South Korea
Asian Games silver medalists for South Korea
Asian Games medalists in field hockey
Medalists at the 1994 Asian Games
Medalists at the 1998 Asian Games